The discography of American metalcore band Converge consists of nine studio albums, three compilation albums, two video albums, six extended plays (EPs), and five split releases.

Albums

Studio albums

Live albums

Compilation albums

Video albums

Split albums

Extended plays

Split EPs

Demos

Singles

Music videos

Other appearances

See also

 Epitaph Records discography
 Deathwish Inc. discography

References

External links
 Converge at Discogs
 Converge at Rate Your Music

 
Punk rock group discographies
Heavy metal group discographies
Discographies of American artists